Dark Light is a live album by English musician Gary Numan. The album was released in June 1995 in the United Kingdom. The album was not released in the United States until August 1998. In April 2003 the album was remastered and reissued. The album was recorded at Numan's concert at Labatt's Hammersmith Apollo in London on 12 November 1994 during his Sacrifice Tour. The album reached number 107 on the UK Albums Chart.

Track listing
All tracks written by Gary Numan except where noted.

All timings are approximate and will vary slightly with different equipment.

1995 Numa CD release (NUMACD 1012)
CD One
"Pray (Intro)" – 2:18
"A Question of Faith" – 4:58
"I Dream of Wires" – 5:04
"Noise Noise" – 4:11
"Listen to the Sirens" – 3:11
"Everyday I Die" – 4:27
"Desire" – 4:12
"Friends" – 3:29
"Scar" – 3:31
"Magic" – 4:57
"Praying to the Aliens" – 3:39
"Replicas" – 5:22
"Mean Street" – 3:43

CD Two
"Stormtrooper in Drag" (Paul Gardiner, Numan) – 4:53
"Deadliner" – 4:48
"Bleed" – 6:03
"The Dream Police" – 4:45
"I Die: You Die" – 3:37
"The Hunter" – 5:33
"Remind Me to Smile" – 3:59
"Are 'Friends' Electric?" – 6:11
"Do You Need the Service?" – 3:00
"Love and Napalm" – 5:28
"Jo the Waiter" – 3:21
"I'm An Agent" – 5:02

1998 Cleopatra U.S. CD reissue (CLP 0334-2)
Same CD track listing as Numa release. Different front, rear and inner tray artwork.

2003 Eagle Records CD reissue (EDMCD 161)
Same CD track listing as Numa release. Different front, rear and inner tray artwork and an essay by Dominic Jones.

Personnel
Gary Numan – vocals, guitar, producer, mixing
John Webb – keyboards
Ade Orange – keyboards, bass, vocals
Kipper – guitar, vocals
Richard Beasley – drums
Scott Simon – photography
Brett Wallace – photography
Ivan Gadsby – photography

References

1995 live albums
Gary Numan live albums